Minotaur is a box set of the first five studio albums by Pixies, released on November 24, 2009. The contents include new artwork by the original Pixies designer Vaughan Oliver and photographer Simon Larbalestier. The collection was released as a Deluxe Edition which includes the albums on gold-plated 24k layered CDs with a Blu-ray Disc and a DVD featuring a 1991 Brixton Academy show and all of Pixies' music videos, packaged with a 54-page book. The Limited Edition package comes in a custom clamshell with all the albums on 180-gram vinyl, along with a Giclée print of artwork made for the collection, and a 72-page hardcover book.

Contents
Come On Pilgrim (1987)
Surfer Rosa (1988)
Doolittle (1989)
Bossanova (1990)
Trompe le Monde (1991)

References

External links
Digital press release #1
Digital press release #2
Digital press release #3

Albums produced by Gil Norton
Albums produced by Steve Albini
Albums produced by Gary Smith (record producer)
Pixies (band) video albums
Pixies (band) compilation albums
Music video compilation albums
Live video albums
2009 compilation albums
2009 live albums
2009 video albums
4AD compilation albums
4AD video albums
4AD live albums
Elektra Records compilation albums
Elektra Records live albums
Elektra Records video albums